Lampropappus is a genus of flowering plants belonging to the family Asteraceae.

Its native range is Tanzania to South Tropical Africa.

Species:

Lampropappus eremanthifolia 
Lampropappus hoffmannii 
Lampropappus turbinellus

References

Asteraceae
Asteraceae genera